The South Yorkshire Transport Museum (SYTM) is a transport museum of South Yorkshire and surrounding areas in the United Kingdom.  It was formerly known as the Sheffield Bus Museum

Founded in the 1960, STYM is located in Aldwarke in Rotherham.

STYM also features buses, the lower deck of a Sheffield Tramway tramcar, a tractor, a lorry, milk floats and an extensive array of bicycles plus static displays of models and memorabilia.

About SYTM
STYM moved to its present location in 2007, when it also changed its name. Since late 2009 there are two units: bay 8 and bay 9.

Some of the open days during the year feature a particular theme such as a Bus Running Day in May, Models Exhibition in June and the Annual South Yorkshire Transport Rally in September.

History
SYTM started in the 1960's with private collections by Keith Beeden and other collectors.  The group purchased a 1946 Leyland PD1 double deck bus that became nucleus of the Sheffield Omnibus Enthusiasts Society.

The SBPC soon became the South Yorkshire Transport Collection, with the aim of formulating a transport collection, on a museum site.  When their current storage site became unavailable, the collection was scattered to Sandtoft, Haxey, County Durham and Merseyside.  The Sheffield City Councilthen provided a site at the Kelham Island Industrial Museum. 

After 10 months, the museum was forced to moved again.  In 1985, the museum was then transferred to a new site at Newton Chambers, in 1985. However, this soon proved to be unacceptable also.

In 1987, The Sheffield Bus Museum Trust opened the Transport Museum at the Tinsley Tram Sheds with the aim of building a bus collection,  Built in 1873-4 for the Sheffield Tramways Company and taken over by Sheffield Corporation in 1896m the tram sheds were extended in 1900

The museum collected buses from the Sheffield, Rotherham and North East Derbyshire operators, including a double deck trolleybus. The vehicles were kept on an open site in Heeley. In order to formalise the vehicle collection policy, the Sheffield Bus Preservation Circle was inaugurated.

The five Trustees of the Sheffield Bus Museum Trust (a charity) were also Guarantors of the lease and later Directors of SBMT Ltd (a company limited by guarantee). They bore personal financial liability for the rent payable to the Landlord: a responsibility that weighed heavily upon them. Without these men (Keith Beeden, Mike Greenwood, David Roberts, David Tummon and Eric Wilson) all the positive developments that have led to the present situation could not have taken place. (Ed.)

Over the years, the museum facility faced chronic flooding problems and a gradual deterioration of the main structure and roof assembly The lease conditions did not permit an early release from the contract, so that little could be done to move away. Storm damage and the theft of lead from the roof in 2006 made the premises unfit for purpose.

On Easter 2007, when the new premises were opened to the general public.

See also
South Yorkshire Transport

External links
 South Yorkshire Transport Museum - official site

Bus museums in England
Museums in South Yorkshire
Transport in South Yorkshire
Tourist attractions in Rotherham